Abed Elrahim Abu Zakrra or AbuZikreea (born Abed Elrahim Ahmed Abed Elrahim, 1943 – December 1989) was a Sudanese writer, poet, and translator.

Early life 
Abed Elrahim was born in the small village of Tangassi El-soeq in Northern, Sudan, close to Meroë town (which is different from the historical Meroë).  He got his primary education in his homeland, but he went to Kosti in White Nile State for his intermediate education.  He also attended secondary school in Khorr Taqatt Secondary School in North Kurdufan State, Western Sudan.

Career 
Abed Elrahim joined the People's Friendship University of Russia in Moscow where he received a master's degree in Russian Language and Literature. In 1971, he received a degree in Bilingual Arabic-Russian translation. He worked as the secretary-editor (1976–1978) and supervisor in the Sudanese Culture Magazine by Arabic Al-thaqaaffa El-ssoddaneia (الثقافة السودانية), which was published in Khartoum (it's stopped for more than two decades ago), he worked as a temporary lecturer in Khartoum University in the art faculty. Abed Elrahim awarded a Ph.D in Philosophy of Language from Academy of Science in Moscow in 1987.

Abed Elrahim is regarded by critics as one of the prominent poets of Sudan, mostly known for his work in the 1960s and 1970s.  He died in Moscow on 16 October 1989 after burning most of his poetry.  His only published poetry was in the 1960s-1970s in many local magazines, as well as the Arab World Magazine.

Works 
 'Travel on the Night' (transliterated Alraheel fee El-lieiel) was published in 1973 by the U of K Publishing House. It is located in the Khartoum University poetry collection.

References 
 Sudenese net 
 Albawaba,com 

1943 births
1989 deaths
20th-century Sudanese poets
Sudanese translators
Peoples' Friendship University of Russia alumni
20th-century translators
Sudanese expatriates in the Soviet Union